Ernst Streng (25 January 1942 – 27 March 1993) was a German cyclist. He competed in the Men's team pursuit at the 1964 Summer Olympics where he won a gold medal.

References 

1942 births
1993 deaths
Cyclists at the 1964 Summer Olympics
Olympic cyclists of the United Team of Germany
Olympic gold medalists for the United Team of Germany
German male cyclists
Olympic medalists in cycling
Cyclists from Cologne
Medalists at the 1964 Summer Olympics
German track cyclists
20th-century German people